Estudantes Sport Club, also known as Estudantes, are a Brazilian football team from Timbaúba, Pernambuco. They competed in the Série B in 1991, and in the Série C in 1990.

History
Estudantes Sport Club were founded on May 1, 1958. The club competed in the Série C in 1990, when they were eliminated in the first stage. They competed in the Série B in 1991, when they were eliminated in the  first stage of the competition. Estudantes won the Campeonato Pernambucano Second Level in 2005.

Stadium
Estudantes play their home games at Estádio Ferreira Lima. The stadium has a maximum capacity of 5,000 people.

Achievements

 Campeonato Pernambucano Second Level:
 Winners (1): 2005

References

Association football clubs established in 1958
Football clubs in Pernambuco
1958 establishments in Brazil